St. Servatius' College is a boys' school located in Matara, Sri Lanka.  The school was established in 1897 by recently arrived Belgian Jesuit missionaries, led by Joseph Van Reeth, first bishop of Galle and Father Augustus Standaert. St. Servatius' College is a national school, which provides primary and secondary education.

History

St. Servatius' College was founded when the Bishop of Galle, Joseph Van Reeth, wanted to create an educational infrastructure in the newly established diocese, and called on the Belgian Jesuits for help. Father Augustus Standaert, among others, arrived in Galle in 1896, and on 2 November 1897, the priests opened an English medium school on a small plot of land on the banks of the River Nilwala in Pallimulla, Matara. The school opened with five students in 1896, and within two years it had grown to accommodate 54 students.

In August 1898, a new structure was erected for the school. As the construction funds came from the St. Servatius Jesuit school of Liège, Belgium, the Matara school adopted the name of this patron saint: Servatius of Tonegeren, a 4th-century Belgian missionary, and one of the first bishops in the area around Tongeren, Maastricht, and Liège.

After some years the school was moved to its present location in Kotuwegoda, Matara. In 1961, as part of a government program to take over private schools, the school was adopted by the Ministry of Education, although it remained administered by Roman Catholic fathers until 1965.

Currently, over 3,000 students are enrolled at St. Servatius' College. The school employs over one hundred staff, led by Principal Mr. H K L B Virajith. It was made a Sri Lankan national school in 1993.

Principals

College houses
College house names are listed in alphabetical order.
 Adolphust - 
 Beernaert - 
 Standaert -  
 Walter -

St. Thomas'–St. Servatius Cricket Encounter

The St. Thomas'–St. Servatius Cricket Encounter, known as the Battle of the Blues, is the annual cricket match played between St. Servatius' College and St. Thomas' College, Matara. The match has been played since 1900, and is the second-oldest school cricket series in Sri Lanka.

Notable alumni

Notable Alumni of St. Servatius' College

See also
 List of Jesuit schools
 Basilica of Saint Servatius
 Servatius of Tongeren
 Joseph Van Reeth

References

External links
 St. Servatius' College Official Web Site
 St. Servatius' College on Viki

1897 establishments in Ceylon
Boys' schools in Sri Lanka
Educational institutions established in 1897
Sri Lanka
National schools in Sri Lanka
Schools in Matara, Sri Lanka
St. Servatius' College, Sri Lanka